"Love Ain't" is a song recorded by American country music group Eli Young Band. It was released on May 25, 2018 as the first single from their compilation album This Is Eli Young Band: Greatest Hits. The song was written by Ross Copperman, Ashley Gorley and Shane McAnally.

Content and history
"Love Ain't" is an original composition intended as a lead single to the band's first greatest-hits package, This Is Eli Young Band. It is their first single release since "Saltwater Gospel" in 2016.

Music video
For the song's Jeff Ray-directed music video, the band consulted the Wounded Warrior Project to find "any couples that would be willing to tell their story". The video features Taylor Morris, a quadruple amputee soldier, and his wife. Lead singer Mike Eli told Billboard that "This teaches you what you should expect from the person who loves you and what you should expect from yourself."

Chart performance
The song became the band's first number one in nearly six years, after "Drunk Last Night" reached the top of the Country Airplay chart in December 2013.

Charts

Weekly charts

Year-end charts

Certifications

References

2018 songs
2018 singles
Eli Young Band songs
Big Machine Records singles
Songs written by Ross Copperman
Songs written by Ashley Gorley
Songs written by Shane McAnally
Song recordings produced by Dann Huff